Liam Hodgins is a three-time captain of the Galway senior hurling team. He won an all star award in 2001 when Galway were narrowly defeated by Tipperary in the all Ireland final. He played at centre back that day.

He is currently playing for his club Tynagh-Abbey/Duniry. Liam is one of the senior members of that team.

References

 

Living people
Tynagh-Abbey/Duniry hurlers
Galway inter-county hurlers
Connacht inter-provincial hurlers
Year of birth missing (living people)